Strigocossus kushit is a moth in the  family Cossidae. It was described by Yakovlev in 2011. It is found in Ethiopia.

References

Natural History Museum Lepidoptera generic names catalog

Zeuzerinae
Moths described in 2011